Nowosielec  is a village in the administrative district of Gmina Nisko, within Nisko County, Subcarpathian Voivodeship, in south-eastern Poland.

The village has a population of 1,500.

References

Nowosielec